An international decoration is a military award which is not bestowed by a particular country, but rather by an international organization such as the United Nations or NATO. Such awards are normally issued as service medals, for participation in various international military operations, and not for specific acts of heroism or bravery. The first medal from an international organization accepted for wear by the United States Military was the United Nations Korea Medal in 1951. Acceptance of these international decorations must be approved by not only the Secretary of Defense, but also the Secretary of State.

The following is a list of the most commonly recognized international military decorations that has been or is currently awarded to members of the United States military. Such awards are always worn after all United States decorations, but before all Foreign decorations.

United Nations

The Assistant Secretary of Defense approved a change to the policy of the wear of United Nations Medals. Effective 13 October 1995, any US military personnel who is awarded a United Nations Medal may wear the ribbon of the first UN medal for which they qualify. Subsequent awards of the United Nations Medal for service in a different mission is noted by adding a bronze service star to the current ribbon.  No more than one UN medal or ribbon may be worn at a time. Operations in which United States military personnel were awarded the United Nations Medal and authorized by the Department of Defense to accept and wear the medal are as follows:

 United Nations Truce Supervision Organization (UNTSO) in Palestinian territories/United Nations Observation Group in Lebanon
 United Nations Observer Group in India and Pakistan
 United Nations Korea Medal
 United Nations Temporary Executive Authority/UN Security Force in West New Guinea
 United Nations Iraq–Kuwait Observation Mission
 United Nations Mission for the Referendum in Western Sahara
 United Nations Advance Mission in Cambodia
  United Nations Protection Force in Yugoslavia
 United Nations Transitional Authority in Cambodia
 United Nations Operation in Somalia II
 United Nations Operation in Mozambique
 United Nations Observer Mission in Georgia
 United Nations Mission in Haiti/United Nations Support Mission in Haiti
 United Nations Preventive Deployment Force
 United Nations Transitional Administration for Eastern Slavonia, Baranja and Western Sirmium
 United Nations Verification Mission in Guatemala
 United Nations Special Service Medal/United Nations Assistance Mission in Iraq
 United Nations Interim Administration Mission in Kosovo
 United Nations Mission in East Timor/United Nations Transitional Administration in East Timor/United Nations Mission of Support to East Timor
 United Nations Mission in the Democratic Republic of Congo/United Nations Organization Stabilization Mission in the Democratic Republic of the Congo
 United Nations Mission in Ethiopia and Eritrea
 United Nations Mission in Liberia
 United Nations Stabilisation Mission in Haiti
 United Nations–African Union Mission in Darfur
 United Nations Mission in the Central African Republic and Chad
 United Nations Organization Stabilization Mission in the Democratic Republic of the Congo
 United Nations Multidimensional Integrated Stabilization Mission in the Central African Republic
 United Nations Multidimensional Integrated Stabilization Mission in Mali

North Atlantic Treaty Organization

United States military personnel may accept and wear NATO medals authorized by the Secretary General of NATO and offered to the US Representative to NATO to 
recognize US service members who meet the eligibility criteria specified by NATO, so long as acceptance is approved by both the Secretary of Defense and the Secretary of State. NATO Medals may be awarded with a clasp that designates the operation for which the medal is awarded. United States military personnel may accept, but not wear the clasp. To date the following medals are the only NATO Medals authorized for acceptance and wear by US military personnel:

 NATO Meritorious Service Medal
  Yugoslavia service medal
  Kosovo service
 NATO Article 5 medal for Operation Eagle Assist
 NATO Article 5 medal for Operation Active Endeavour
 Non-article 5 medal for ISAF
  NATO Non-Article 5 medal for the Balkans
 Non-Article 5 medal for NATO Training Mission – Iraq
 Non-Article 5 medal for Africa Operations Allied Provider, Allied Protector, and Ocean Shield
 NATO Non-Article 5 medal for Operation Unified Protector
 NATO Non-Article 5 medal for Operation Resolute Support

Multinational Force and Observers

 Multinational Force and Observers Medal

Inter-American Defense Board

 Inter-American Defense Board Medal

SICOFAA
The System of Cooperation Among the American Air Forces awards the following decorations:

  SICOFAA Legion of Merit Gentleman
  SICOFAA Legion of Merit Officer
  SICOFAA Legion of Merit Grand Cross

CSDP

Common Security and Defence Policy

  CSDP ALTHEA Operations medal ribbon bar
  CSDP ALTHEA Staff medal ribbon bar
  CSDP EUTM MALI Medal for Extraordinary Meritorious Service ribbon bar

Notes

See also
Awards and decorations of the United States military

Military awards and decorations of the United States